Blufunk Is a Fact! was the first studio album by Keziah Jones, released in 1992. This album was formative for Keziah's own style, called Blufunk.  The song "Pleasure Is Kisses Within" is sampled by Mike Posner on his track "Who Knows?" (feat Big Sean).

Track listing
 "The Wisdom Behind the Smile (Cash)" – 4:07
 "Walkin' Naked Thru' a Bluebell Field" – 3:31
 "Rhythm Is Love" – 4:18
 "Runaway (Slavery Days Are Over)" – 3:02
 "Where's Life?" – 4:50
 "The Funderlying Undermentals" – 4:07
 "Frinigro Interstellar" – 3:12
 "Free Your Soul" – 4:05
 "A Curious Kind of Subconscious" – 4:08
 "The Waxing + the Waning" – 2:47
 "The Invisible Ladder" – 2:53
 "Pleasure Is Kisses Within" – 3:00

Charts

References

1992 debut albums
Keziah Jones albums